The Fellowship of the Frog is a 1925 crime novel by the British writer Edgar Wallace. It was part of a series of books featuring the character Inspector Elk of Scotland Yard. In 1936 it was adapted into a West End play The Frog by Ian Hay, which inspired the subsequent films.

Film adaptations
An American film serial Mark of the Frog was made in 1928.

In 1937 it was turned into a British film The Frog directed by Jack Raymond and starring Gordon Harker as Elk. Due to its popularity it was followed by a sequel The Return of the Frog the next year.

In 1959 the West German film Der Frosch mit der Maske film was made, inspired the novel. It commenced a lengthy series of Wallace adaptations made by Rialto Film made over the following decade.

References

External links
 
 

1925 British novels
British crime novels
British novels adapted into films
Novels by Edgar Wallace